is a Japanese football player who plays as a right back or a defensive midfielder for Swiss Super League club Grasshopper Club Zürich, on loan from J1 League club Shimizu S-Pulse. He has also represented Japan at various levels and is a current Japan U20's international.

Club career
Hara played junior football for AZ'86 Tokyo-Ome FC in Ome, Tokyo. He later played for the Funabashi Municipal High School Club in the Prince Takamado Cup Premier League before signing for J1 League club Albirex Niigata in September 2016. Hara made his debut for Albirex on the opening day of the 2017 season against Sanfrecce Hiroshima.

On 29 December 2022, he joined Swiss Super League side Grasshopper Club Zürich on loan with an option to buy.

International career
Hara has represented Japan U-20 national team. He was a member of the Japan squad that won the 2016 AFC U-19 Championship. In May 2017, he was elected Japan for 2017 U-20 World Cup. At this tournament, he played all 4 matches as defensive midfielder.

On May 24, 2019, Hara has been called by Japan's head coach Hajime Moriyasu to feature in the Copa América played in Brazil. He made his debut on 17 June 2019 in the  game against Chile, as a starter.

Club statistics
Updated to 2 January 2023.

National team statistics

Honours

International
Japan U-19
AFC U-19 Championship 2016

References

External links

 

Profile at Albirex Niigata

1998 births
Living people
Association football people from Saitama Prefecture
Japanese footballers
Japan youth international footballers
Japan under-20 international footballers
Japan international footballers
J1 League players
J2 League players
Swiss Super League players
Albirex Niigata players
Sagan Tosu players
Shimizu S-Pulse players
Grasshopper Club Zürich players
Association football midfielders
Footballers at the 2018 Asian Games
Asian Games silver medalists for Japan
Asian Games medalists in football
Medalists at the 2018 Asian Games
2019 Copa América players
Japanese expatriate footballers
Expatriate footballers in Switzerland
Japanese expatriate sportspeople in Switzerland